The Bridge of San Luis Rey is American author Thornton Wilder's second novel. It was first published in 1927 to worldwide acclaim. The novel won the Pulitzer Prize in 1928, and was the best-selling work of fiction that year.

Premise
The Bridge of San Luis Rey tells the story of several interrelated people who die in the collapse of an Inca rope bridge in Peru, and the events that lead up to their being on the bridge. A friar who witnesses the accident then goes about inquiring into the lives of the victims, seeking some sort of cosmic answer to the question of why each had to die.

Plot

Part One: Perhaps an Accident
The first few pages of the first chapter explain the book's basic premise: the story centers on a fictional event that happened in Peru on the road between Lima and Cuzco, at noon on Friday, July 20, 1714. A rope bridge woven by the Inca a century earlier collapsed at that particular moment, while five people were crossing it, sending them falling from a great height to their deaths in the river below. The collapse was witnessed by Brother Juniper, a Franciscan friar who was on his way to cross the bridge himself. A deeply pious man who seeks to provide some sort of empirical evidence that might prove to the world God's Divine Providence, he sets out to interview everyone he can find who knew the five victims. Over the course of six years, he compiles a huge book of all of the evidence he gathers to show that the beginning and end of a person is all part of God's plan for that person. Part One foretells the burning of the book that occurs at the end of the novel, but it also says that one copy of Brother Juniper's book survives and is at the library of the University of San Marco, where it now sits neglected.

Part Two: the Marquesa de Montemayor; Pepita
Part Two focuses on one of the victims of the collapse: Doña María, the Marquesa de Montemayor. The daughter of a wealthy cloth merchant, the Marquesa was an ugly child who eventually entered into an arranged marriage and bore a daughter, Clara, whom she loved dearly. Clara was indifferent to her mother, though, and became engaged to a Spanish man and moved across the ocean to Spain where she married. Doña María visits her daughter in Spain, but when they cannot get along, she returns to Lima. The only way that they can communicate comfortably is by letter, and Doña María pours her heart into her writing, which becomes so polished that her letters will be read in schools for hundreds of years after her death.

Doña María takes as her companion Pepita, a girl raised at the Convent of Santa María Rosa de las Rosas. When she learns that her daughter is pregnant in Spain, Doña María decides to make a pilgrimage to the shrine of Santa María de Cluxambuqua to pray that the baby will be healthy and loved. Pepita goes along as company and to supervise the staff. When Doña María is out at the shrine, Pepita stays at the inn and writes a letter to her patron, the Abbess María del Pilar, complaining about her misery and loneliness. Doña María sees the letter on the table when she gets back and reads it. Later, she asks Pepita about the letter, and Pepita says she tore it up because the letter was not brave. Doña María has new insight into the ways in which her own life and love for her daughter have lacked bravery. She writes her "first letter" (actually Letter LVI) of courageous love to her daughter, but two days later, returning to Lima, she and Pepita are on the bridge of San Luis Rey when it collapses.

Part Three: Esteban
Esteban and Manuel are twins who were left at the Convent of Santa María Rosa de las Rosas as infants. The Abbess of the convent, Madre María del Pilar, developed a fondness for them as they grew up. When they became older, they decided to be scribes. They are so close that they have developed a secret language that only they understand. Their closeness becomes strained when Manuel falls in love with Camila Perichole, a famous actress.

Perichole flirts with Manuel and swears him to secrecy when she retains him to write letters to her lover, the Viceroy. Esteban has no idea of their relationship until she turns up at the twins' room one night in a hurry and has Manuel write to a matador with whom she is having an affair. Esteban encourages his brother to follow her, but instead Manuel swears that he will never see her again. Later, Manuel cuts his knee on a piece of metal and it becomes infected. The surgeon instructs Esteban to put cold compresses on the injury: the compresses are so painful that Manuel curses Esteban, though he later remembers nothing of his curses. Esteban offers to send for the Perichole, but Manuel refuses. Soon after, Manuel dies.

When the Abbess comes to prepare the body, she asks Esteban his name, and he says he is Manuel. Gossip about his ensuing strange behavior spreads all over town. He goes to the theater but runs away before the Perichole can talk to him; the Abbess also tries to talk to him, but he runs away, so she sends for Captain Alvarado.

Captain Alvarado, a well-known sailor and explorer, goes to see Esteban in Cuzco and hires him to sail the world with him, far from Peru. Esteban agrees, then refuses, then acquiesces if he can get all his pay in advance to buy a present for the Abbess before he departs. That night Esteban attempts suicide but is saved by Captain Alvarado. The Captain offers to take him back to Lima to buy the present, and at the ravine spanned by the bridge of San Luis Rey, the Captain goes down to a boat that is ferrying some materials across the water. Esteban goes to the bridge and is on it when it collapses.

Part Four: Uncle Pio; Don Jaime
Uncle Pio acts as Camila Perichole's valet, and, in addition, "her singing-master, her coiffeur, her masseur, her reader, her errand-boy, her banker; rumor added: her father." He was born the bastard son of a Madrid aristocrat and later traveled the world engaged in a wide variety of dubious, though legal, businesses, most related to being a go-between or agent of the powerful, including (briefly) conducting interrogations for the Inquisition. His life "became too complicated" and he fled to Peru. He came to realize that he had just three interests in the world: independence; the constant presence of beautiful women; and the masterpieces of Spanish literature, particularly those of the theater.

He finds work as the confidential agent of the Viceroy of Peru. One day, he discovers a twelve-year-old café singer, Micaela Villegas, and takes her under his protection. Over the course of years, as they travel from tavern to tavern throughout Latin America, she grows into a beautiful and talented young woman. Uncle Pio instructs her in the etiquette of high society and goads her to greatness by expressing perpetual disappointment with her performances. She develops into Camila Perichole, the most honored actress in Lima.

After many years of success, the Perichole becomes bored with the stage. The elderly Viceroy, Don Andrés, takes her as his mistress; she and Uncle Pio and the Archbishop of Peru and, eventually, Captain Alvarado meet frequently at midnight for dinner at the Viceroy's mansion. Through it all, Uncle Pio remains faithfully devoted to her, but as Camila ages and bears three children by the Viceroy she focuses on becoming a lady rather than an actress. She avoids Uncle Pio, and when he talks to her she tells him to not use her stage name.

When a smallpox epidemic sweeps through Lima, Camila is disfigured by it. She takes her young son Don Jaime, who suffers from convulsions, to the country.  Uncle Pio sees her one night trying hopelessly to cover her pockmarked face with powder; ashamed, she refuses to ever see him again. He begs her to allow him to take her son to Lima and teach the boy as he taught her. Despairing at the turn her life has taken, she reluctantly agrees. Uncle Pio and Jaime leave the next morning, and are the fourth and fifth people on the bridge of San Luis Rey when it collapses.

Part Five: Perhaps an Intention
Brother Juniper labors for six years on his book about the bridge collapse, talking to everyone he can find who knew the victims, trying various mathematical formulas to measure spiritual traits, with no results beyond conventionally pious generalizations. He compiles his huge book of interviews with complete faith in God's goodness and justice, but a council pronounces his work heretical, and the book and Brother Juniper are publicly burned for their heresy.

The story then shifts back in time to the day of a funeral service for those who died in the bridge collapse. The Archbishop, the Viceroy, and Captain Alvarado are at the ceremony. At the Convent of Santa María Rosa de las Rosas, the Abbess feels, having lost Pepita and the twin brothers, that her work to help the poor and infirm will die with her. A year after the accident, Camila Perichole seeks out the Abbess to ask how she can go on, having lost her son and Uncle Pio. Camila gains comfort and insight from the Abbess and, it is later revealed, becomes a helper at the Convent. Later, Doña Clara arrives from Spain, also seeking out the Abbess to speak with her about her mother, the Marquesa de Montemayor. She is greatly moved by the work of the Abbess in caring for the deaf, the insane, and the dying. The novel ends with the Abbess' observation: "There is a land of the living and a land of the dead and the bridge is love, the only survival, the only meaning."

Themes and sources
Thornton Wilder said that the book poses the question: "Is there a direction and meaning in lives beyond the individual's own will?" Describing the sources of his novel, Wilder explained that the plot was inspired in its external action by a one-act play [Le Carrosse du Saint-Sacrement] by [the French playwright] Prosper Mérimée, which takes place in Latin America and one of whose characters is a courtesan. However, the central idea of the work, the justification for a number of human lives that comes up as a result of the sudden collapse of a bridge, stems from friendly arguments with my father, a strict Calvinist. Strict Puritans imagine God all too easily as a petty schoolmaster who minutely weights guilt against merit, and they overlook God's 'Caritas' which is more all-encompassing and powerful. God's love has to transcend his just retribution. But in my novel I have left this question unanswered. As I said earlier, we can only pose the question correctly and clearly, and have faith one will ask the question in the right way.

When asked if his characters were historical or imagined, Wilder replied, "The Perichole and the Viceroy are real people, under the names they had in history [a street singer named Micaela Villegas and her lover Manuel de Amat y Junyent, who was Viceroy of Peru at the time]. Most of the events were invented by me, including the fall of the bridge." He based the Marquesa's habit of writing letters to her daughter on his knowledge of the great French letter-writer Madame de Sévigné.

The bridge itself (in both Wilder's story and Mérimée's play) is based on the great Inca road suspension bridge across the Apurímac River, erected around 1350, still in use in 1864, and dilapidated but still hanging in 1890. When asked by the explorer Victor Wolfgang von Hagen whether he had ever seen a reproduction of E. G. Squier's woodcut illustration of the bridge as it was in 1864, Wilder replied: "It is best, von Hagen, that I make no comment or point of it." In fact, in a letter to Yale professor Chauncey Tinker, Wilder wrote that he had invented the bridge altogether. The name of the bridge is drawn from the Mission San Luis Rey de Francia in San Diego County, California.

Recognition and influence 
The Bridge of San Luis Rey won the 1928 Pulitzer Prize for the Novel, and remains  In 1998, the book was rated number 37 by the editorial board of the American Modern Library on the list of the 100 best 20th-century novels. Time magazine included the novel in its TIME 100 Best English-language Novels from 1923 to 2005.

Influences 
 The Bridge of San Luis Rey is mentioned in Elizabeth Goudge's war-time novel The Castle on the Hill (1942, Chapter I, Part II), where a major character explains that, "... in this case death came to those five just at the most fitting moment of their lives, and that this so-called tragedy, as it affected the lives of others, brought alterations in the pattern [of life] that spelled in the long run only blessing and peace": this character, an elderly historian, is attempting to offer consolation to a woman he has just met whose life has been full of personal tragedy and war-time disaster).
 The Bridge of San Luis Rey was cited by American writer John Hersey as a direct inspiration for his nonfiction work Hiroshima (1946).
 Qui non riposano, a 1945 novel by Indro Montanelli, takes inspiration from the novel.
 David Mitchell's novels Ghostwritten and Cloud Atlas echo the story in many ways, most explicitly through the character Luisa Rey.
 Ayn Rand references the theme in Atlas Shrugged, her epic of a fictional USA's decline into an impoverished kleptocracy. In the aftermath of a disastrous collision in a railroad tunnel, she highlights train passengers who, in one way or another, promoted the moral climate that made the accident likely.
 The book is mentioned in passing by a character in The Dark Tower III: The Waste Lands, the third book in Stephen King's Dark Tower series.
 The book is referred to in the novel Numero Zero (2015), by Umberto Eco.
 The story is quoted on the cover of Sea Power's 2003 album The Decline of British Sea Power.
 The novel is mentioned in passing by a character in Joe Hill's 2016 novel The Fireman.
 The Australian television series Glitch references the novel and quotes the passage "There is a land of the living and a land of the dead and the bridge is love, the only survival, the only meaning."

Inspirational 
 The book was quoted by British Prime Minister Tony Blair during the memorial service for victims of the September 11 attacks in 2001.
 The book was cited during the 2007 Minneapolis bridge collapse by Brian Williams of NBC News as well as Charlie Gibson of ABC News.

Adaptations 
Film
Three U.S. theatrical films and a television adaptation (1958) have been based on the novel:
 The Bridge of San Luis Rey (1929)
 The Bridge of San Luis Rey (1944)
 The Bridge of San Luis Rey (1958)
 The Bridge of San Luis Rey (2004)

Theater
A play for puppets and actors was based on the novel, adapted by Greg Carter and directed by Sheila Daniels:
 The Bridge of San Luis Rey (2006)

A play adapted by Cynthia Meier has been performed in Arizona and Connecticut.

Opera
An opera by German composer Hermann Reutter was based on the novel:
 Die Brücke von San Luis Rey: Szenen nach der Novelle von Thornton Wilder (1954)

See also

 List of bridge disasters
 Modern Library 100 Best Novels of the 20th Century
 Photos of the first edition of The Bridge of San Luis Rey

References

External links
 
 
 The Bridge of San Luis Rey Plot Summary and Critical Analysis; by The Thornton Wilder Society
 The Bridge of San Luis Rey Teaching and Reading Educational Materials; by The Thornton Wilder Society

1927 American novels
American novellas
American novels adapted into films
Bridges in fiction
Novels set in Lima
Novels set in Peru
Novels set in the 1710s
Pulitzer Prize for the Novel-winning works
Boni & Liveright books